A list of films produced by the Israeli film industry in 1955.

1955 releases

See also
1955 in Israel

References

External links
 Israeli films of 1955 at the Internet Movie Database

Lists of 1955 films by country or language
Film
1955